Leeway is an American crossover thrash band formed in Astoria, New York in 1984 by guitarist A.J. Novello and vocalist Eddie Sutton under the name The Unruled. To date, the band has released four studio albums — Born to Expire (1989), Desperate Measures (1991), Adult Crash (1994) and Open Mouth Kiss (1995) — and broken up and reformed several times over the years. Despite never achieving notable commercial success, Leeway is considered to be an integral part of the 1980s NYHC and crossover thrash scenes.

History 
Leeway gained notoriety in the mid-to-late 1980s by playing alongside groups such as Crumbsuckers, Prong, Ludichrist, Bad Brains, and Sick of It All at the predominantly hardcore punk-oriented CBGB venue, and had metal influences from the start. For their tight fusion of hardcore, punk, heavy metal, thrash, hip-hop and even reggae, Leeway are often credited as being one of the most influential and exploratory bands to emerge from the NYHC scene. Guitarist and songwriter A.J. Novello said of their career "We might have helped open up a can of worms by bringing suburban metalheads to shows. Years later, it kind of ruined things in the scene, but I can't say I have any regrets." The fact that the band experimented with sound, had two guitarists riffing and solo-ing between them and the singer dressed in skeleton outfits and Yankees uniforms also set them out from the rest of the hardcore punk scene.

Leeway subsequently signed to Profile Records, which released the band's first two albums, Born to Expire (1989) and Desperate Measures (1991); both albums were well received by fans and critics alike, and Leeway toured relentlessly in support of them. However, sharing the stage with their NYHC peers as well as other bands like Bad Brains, Exodus, Overkill, Suicidal Tendencies, Sepultura, Flotsam and Jetsam, Sacred Reich, Morbid Angel and GWAR, and their video for "Kingpin" getting airplay on MTV's Headbangers Ball, did nothing to improve record sales and the band's reputation, and by 1992, they had severed ties with Profile. In a 2014 interview with No Echo, guitarist Michael Gibbons recalled of the band's tenure with the label:

Following their split with Profile, Leeway released two more albums on Bulletproof Records – Adult Crash (1994) and Open Mouth Kiss (1995) – before disbanding in 1996. There was a short lived reunion in 2006 which saw the band playing again, most notably with the Bad Brains, at CBGB and a European Festival tour, which was the last time the band performed live for another ten years. Leeway once again reformed in 2016, and they have since continued performing live sporadically.

Their song "Enforcer" was featured on the playlist of the radio show "L.C.H.C" in the game Grand Theft Auto IV in 2008.

Members 

 Eddie Sutton – lead vocals (1983–1996, 2006)
 A.J. Novello – guitars (1983–1996, 2006)
 Jimmy Xanthos – bass (1989–1996, 2006)
 Pokey Mo – drums (1988–1996, 2006)

 Gordon Ancis – guitars (1986–1987)
 Michael Gibbons – guitars (1987–1992)
 Jose Ochoa – bass (1983–1986)
 Eddie Cohen – bass (1988)
 Howie "Zowie" Ackerman – bass (1987–1988)
 Saso Motroni – drums (1983–1985)
 Mackie Jayson – drums (1985–1987)
 Tony Fontao – drums (1987–1988)
 Matty Pasta – guitars (2012)

Timeline

Discography

References

External links 

BNR Metal band page
PUNKCAST#12 live video @ Wetlands, NYC, on April 4, 1999. (RealPlayer)

Hardcore punk groups from New York (state)
Heavy metal musical groups from New York (state)
Crossover thrash groups
American thrash metal musical groups
Musical groups established in 1984